Yusef-e Eslam (also Romanized as Yūsef-e Eslām; also known as Yūsef Salām and Yūsof Salām) is a village in Dust Mohammad Rural District, in the Central District of Hirmand County, Sistan and Baluchestan Province, Iran. At the 2006 census, its population was 115, in 25 families.

References 

Populated places in Hirmand County